Salisbury Airport can refer to:
Harare International Airport
Salisbury-Ocean City Wicomico Regional Airport